Girls Town may refer to:

 Girls Town (1959 film), American film
 Girls Town (1996 film), American film